In mathematics, Bernstein's theorem may refer to:

Bernstein's theorem about the Sato–Bernstein polynomial
Bernstein's problem about minimal surfaces
Bernstein's theorem on monotone functions
Bernstein's theorem (approximation theory)
Bernstein's theorem (polynomials)
 Bernstein's lethargy theorem
Bernstein–von Mises theorem
Cantor–Bernstein–Schroeder theorem in set theory.